Alfred Low (died 10 June 1946) was a Trinidadian cricketer. He played in six first-class matches for Trinidad and Tobago from 1896 to 1901.

See also
 List of Trinidadian representative cricketers

References

External links
 

Year of birth missing
1946 deaths
Trinidad and Tobago cricketers